National Route 318 is a national highway of Japan connecting Tokushima, Tokushima and Higashikagawa, Kagawa in Japan, with a total length of 43.4 km (26.97 mi).

References

National highways in Japan
Roads in Kagawa Prefecture
Roads in Tokushima Prefecture